Palaeotherium (Ancient Greek for 'old beast') is an extinct genus of perissodactyl ungulate known from the Mid Eocene to earliest Oligocene of Europe. First described by French naturalist Georges Cuvier in 1804, Palaeotherium was among the first Paleogene mammals to be described.

Taxonomy
Palaeotherium belongs to the family Palaeotheriidae, a group proposed to consist of two subfamilies, the Palaeotheriinae representing Palaeotherium and the Plagiolophinae containing the closely related Plagiolophus. Although at times proposed to be ancestral to modern horses the palaeotheres are now considered a sister taxon to the Equidae, and not part of the same lineage.

The species and subspecies referable to Palaeotherium are a subject of debate, due in part to the diversity of species within the genus. Species and subspecies are mainly assigned based on dental and cranial characteristics.

Description 
The average species of Palaeotherium stood at c.  tall at the shoulder.

Post-cranially Palaeotherium was relatively robust with long legs and three-toed fore and hindfeet. The forelimbs were proportionally longer than the hindlimbs. Elongated but robust tarsal and carpal bones indicate a cursorial locomotion for the genus. The cervical vertebra are also elongate, and particularly so in P. magnum, giving Palaeotherium a relatively long neck.

Palaeotherium exhibits a selenolophodont dentition, with high crowned cheek teeth. The genus shows a trend for increasingly molariform premolars, beginning with early species such as P. medium and developing further in P. muehlbergi and P. magnum. 

Palaeotherium possessed a skull with a vaguely similar shape to that of a horse, although the skull was much shorter with the orbits in a more anterior position. This is partly due to the greater development of the temporal muscles, which required longer temporal pits.

Georges Cuvier originally described Palaeotherium as a kind of tapir, and as such, Palaeotherium was popularly reconstructed as a tapir-like animal. 19th and 20th century reconstructions, most famously those at Crystal Palace Park, depicted Palaeotherium with a short trunk like that seen in tapirs. Reconstructions of this nature are now considered erroneous with Palaeotherium exhibiting a suite of distinct skeletal characteristics to Tapirs, such as more elongated legs, relatively long upright necks, and longer forelimbs than hindlimbs. Furthermore, although the nasal bones are set back, there is no specialization of the nasal area for proboscis like that observed in tapirs. A closer post-cranial would be the okapi.

Palaeontology 
Fossils of Palaeotherium have been found across Europe in Middle Eocene-early Oligocene strata in France, Spain, Portugal, Germany, Switzerland, the United Kingdom and Greece.

Palaeotherium magnum the type species of the genus was first described based on fossils from the Gypsum of Montmartre and the Buttes Chaumont in Paris, since then fossils have been collected at a variety of sites across France including the Phosphorites du Quercy, La Debruge, Aubrelong and Escamps.

In the United Kingdom Palaeotherium material has been found in the Hampshire Basin, occurring alongside the closely related palaeothere Plagiolophus. Isolated teeth, bones and rare articulated material of P. magnum, P. medium, P. curtum and P. muehlbergi have been regularly collected from the Priabonian to Rupelian coastal plain sediments of the Solent Group, exposed along the northern coastline of the Isle of Wight and at Hordle Cliff in Hampshire. Rarer and slightly older material dating to the Bartonian has also been collected from the lacustrine Creechbarrow Limestone in Dorset, and in the shallow marine sediments of the Barton Group at Barton Cliff and Elmore in Hampshire.

In 2010 a reassessment of perissodactyl post cranial material collected in the mid-19th century from Balouk Keui in Thrace revealed the bones to belong to a Palaeothere. The bones were attributed to Palaeotherium sp., cf. P. Magnum. The discovery of Palaeotherium fossils at Balouk Keui constitutes the easternmost record of the genus and greatly extends the known biogeographical range of Palaeotherium, previously considered to be limited to western Europe.

Paleobiology 
Palaeotherium was a relatively large herbivore for Late Eocene Europe. Proportionally longer forelimbs, an elongated neck (especially evident in P. magnum), and high crowned teeth suggest Palaeotherium is likely to have been a browser, with a diet of soft fruit and leaves taken from low hanging vegetation and ground level. The largest species P. magnum may have been capable of browsing at heights of up to 2m. These browsing adaptions indicate Palaeotherium may have had a preference for wooded or at least semi-wooded habitats.

Palaeotherium became extinct during the Grande Coupure c.33.6 million years ago, an important faunal turnover event in the early Oligocene that saw the extinction of many of the mammal groups that typify Late Eocene Europe. As climatic conditions cooled and dried at the onset of the Oligocene immigrant taxa from Asia dispersed into Europe, including anthracotheres, entelodonts, and rhinocerotids. These groups may have been better adapted to the changed climatic conditions and rapidly replaced most of the components of the Late Eocene faunas. The ecological niches left vacant by the extinction of the Palaeotheres were likely assumed by rhinocerotids such as Ronzotherium.

The facies represented in the Solent Group of the Hampshire Basin indicate Palaeotherium was residing on a low-lying coastal floodplain, with areas of seasonally inundated wetlands and lakes, with floodplain forests.

References

External links

Eocene odd-toed ungulates
Eocene genus extinctions
Eocene mammals of Europe
Fossil taxa described in 1804
Taxa named by Georges Cuvier